Nick Gerakines (born Baton Rouge, Louisiana 1983) is an American author, software engineer, and speaker. He is a contributor to a number of notable open source Erlang projects on GitHub and is the author of the book Facebook Application Development.

References 

Living people
American computer programmers
American male writers
Writers from Louisiana
1983 births